The Armstrong Air & Space Museum is a museum in Wapakoneta, Ohio, the hometown of aviator and astronaut Neil Armstrong, the first man to set foot on the Moon. Opened in 1972, the museum chronicles Ohio's contributions to the history of aeronautics and space flight. The museum is home to the original Gemini 8 spacecraft piloted by Armstrong to perform the world's first space docking, two of Armstrong's space suits, multiple items from the Apollo Program missions, a Moon rock brought back during the Apollo 11 mission, and an F5D Skylancer. The museum has several main galleries that cover the early beginnings of the Space Race, all the way to the end of the Space Shuttle Era. In the museum's Astro-theater, multimedia presentations and documentaries are cast upon the interior of the dome.

The Armstrong Museum is a member site in a larger network of museums and destinations owned by the Ohio History Connection. The National Aviation Heritage Area (NAHA) lists the Armstrong Air & Space Museum as one of its partner organizations, citing its preservation of historically relevant material related to the history of aerospace. While the museum bears the name of the famed Apollo 11 astronaut, Armstrong had no formal connection with the museum nor did he benefit from the organization in any way.

Neil Armstrong's early years

Neil Alden Armstrong was born on August 5, 1930, on his grandparents' farm, in Washington Township, Auglaize County, near Wapakoneta to Stephen and Viola Armstrong. Neil was the oldest of the Armstrong's three children. Stephen Armstrong was an auditor and was tasked with examining the books from different Ohio counties. The family moved over thirteen times during Neil's childhood, eventually settling back down in Wapakoneta in the mid-1940s. During Armstrong's life in Wapakoneta, he graduated high school and received his pilots license from the now defunct Port Koneta Airfields located on the North end of Wapakoneta. After graduation, Neil went to college at Purdue University to study aeronautical engineering. His schooling was interrupted when the Navy called upon Armstrong to fight in the Korean War conflict.

History

 
On July 21, 1969, with Neil Armstrong and Buzz Aldrin still on the lunar surface, then Ohio Governor James Rhodes proposed to build a museum in Armstrong's hometown of Wapakoneta in his honor. Rhodes declared that the facility would honor "all Ohioans who attempted to defy gravity." The governor pledged that the State of Ohio would contribute $500,000 to the project if the community could provide matching funds. Local efforts to raise the necessary money began immediately after the announcement, with a number of Wapakoneta residents forming a centralized fundraising committee. Over 9,000 people in the area donated to cause within the first year, surpassing the governor's request and raising $528,313.55.

Construction
Governor Rhodes appointed Dan Porter of the Ohio Historical Society to head the overall project. A committee was formed soon after to share ideas, accept bids, and collect relevant artifacts. The museum's winning design was an architectural first, with officials choosing a simulated lunar base layout. The design was a geometric, steel-reinforced concrete building with large earth mounds surrounding the structure to resemble being underground." On the Moon, these mounds would have protected the base from micro-meteorites and the harsh radiation from space. The building's most noticeable feature is its large white dome placed in the center of the structure, which would have been used as a pressure dome if on the lunar surface. Because of its white appearance and the museum's association with the Apollo 11 mission, the dome has also become known to symbolize the Moon. A large straight walkway with airport landing lights guides visitors to the front entrance, with the original concept representing a lunar landing strip. 

The groundbreaking took place on April 16, 1970 in a 16 acre plot of farmland on the east-end of city. The creation of inside exhibits was given to Tom Crouch of the Ohio Historical Society. Years later, Crouch was named as a Curator for the National Air and Space Museum in Washington DC. Many of the museum's inaugural artifacts included the Gemini VIII spacecraft, an H-1 rocket engine, and Armstrong's spacesuits. 

On July 20, 1972, three years after the historic Moon landing, the museum held its grand opening, honored by the attendance of Armstrong, his family, and Tricia Nixon Cox, standing in for her father, Richard M. Nixon, President of the United States." Tricia Nixon Cox also had the distinction of transporting an Apollo 11 lunar sample to the museum for display. An estimated 10,000 people attended the opening, with doors unlocking at precisely 2:00 pm.

Expansions
The first major expansion for the museum occurred in the late 1990s, which removed a garden on the museum's south wing and constructed the Modern Space Gallery in its place. The gallery tells the story of space after the Apollo Program with an emphasis on the Space Shuttle Program and the overall progress of space travel. The area includes two interactive simulators that allows visitors to land a lunar module on the Moon or land the space shuttle on a runway.

Another major expansion occurred in 2019, which included adding the Neil Armstrong STEM Inspiration Center, a classroom space that allows schools groups to conduct hands-on programming and experiments. The center is also used for a number of events the museum hosts over the course of the year. 

Late at night on July 28, 2017, a solid gold replica of an Apollo Lunar Module was stolen.

In August 2020, the first production Learjet 28, which was used by Neil Armstrong to set five aerospace records, was donated to the museum.

Museum exhibits

Craft 

 Douglas F5D Skylancer
 Aeronca Champion, the first plane Neil Armstrong learned how to fly in
 Gemini 8 spacecraft, flown by Neil Armstrong and David Scott
 Learjet 28 Longhorn, only aircraft Neil Armstrong set aviation world records in

Suits/garments
 Neil Armstrong's Gemini VIII spacesuit
 Neil Armstrong's Apollo 11 backup spacesuit
 In-flight suit worn by astronaut Eugene Cernan, the last man on the Moon
 Constant wear garment worn by astronaut Jim Lovell
 Flight garment worn by Ohio astronaut Terence T. Henricks on STS-70
 Replica pressure suit worn by Shuttle Program astronauts
 Soviet hydrosuit used in 1978 on Salyut 6
 Soviet flight suit used during Mir space station

Aerospace

 United States flag taken on the Apollo 11 mission by Neil Armstrong
 Heel restraints on board Columbia during Apollo 11 mission
 A lunar sample - the NASA term for a Moon rock
 Apollo 11 heat shield fragment
 A replica Sputnik I
 Early space food, hygiene equipment, and sleeping bags
 Personal items from Ohio astronaut Judith Resnik 
 Shuttle tire from the Space Shuttle Endeavour.

See also
 United States Astronaut Hall of Fame

References

External links

 Official Site
 Ohio History Connection page for museum
 C-SPAN School Bus visit to the Armstrong Air and Space Museum, November 5, 1998

Aerospace museums in Ohio
Museums in Auglaize County, Ohio
Ohio History Connection
Biographical museums in Ohio
Buildings and structures in Wapakoneta, Ohio
National Aviation Heritage Area
Science museums in Ohio
1972 establishments in Ohio
Air and Space Museum